Kamil Kuzera (born 11 March 1983) is a Polish football manager and former player who played as a defender. He is currently in charge of Ekstraklasa club Korona Kielce.

Honours
Wisła Kraków
Ekstraklasa: 2002–03, 2004–05
Polish Cup: 2001–02, 2002–03
Polish League Cup: 2000–01

References

External links
 Profile at Soccerway
 

1983 births
Living people
Sportspeople from Kielce
Association football defenders
Polish footballers
Poland youth international footballers
Poland under-21 international footballers
Wisła Kraków players
Polonia Warsaw players
Górnik Zabrze players
Widzew Łódź players
Korona Kielce players
Ekstraklasa players
I liga players
III liga players
Polish football managers
Korona Kielce managers
Ekstraklasa managers
I liga managers